Cleistogenes serotina is a species of grass in the family Poaceae, native to Europe and temperate Asia.  Culms are geniculately ascending, 1 mm in diameter, and 30–60 cm in height. Leaf-blades are spreading, flat, or involute, from 4–8 cm long and 3–5 mm wide.

Synonyms
 Festuca serotina
 Kengia serotina

References

External links
 Grassbase - The World Online Grass Flora
 
 USDA Plants Profile entry
 Clayton, W. D. & S. A. Renvoize. 1986. Genera graminum. Kew Bull add. ser. 13:1-389. [treats Cleistogenes as a name not validly published, accepting Kengia].
 Davis, P. H., ed. 1965–1988. Flora of Turkey and the east Aegean islands. [accepts Cleistogenes].
 Tutin, T. G. et al., eds. 1964–1980. Flora europaea. [accepts Cleistogenes].
 Tzvelev, N. N. 1976. Zlaki SSSR. [accepts Cleistogenes].

Chloridoideae
Grasses of Asia
Grasses of Europe
Taxa named by Carl Linnaeus